Zvornik Lake is an artificial lake located on the border of Bosnia and Herzegovina and Serbia. It was created after construction of a hydroelectric power station in 1954 on the Drina river.

Tourism 

There is a large number of cottages and tourist catering facilities around the lake. The lake is suitable for summer vacations, sport and recreational activities on the water and fishing. Zvornik Lake is also suitable for rafting, sailing and swimming.

Wildlife 

The lake is known for the large wels catfishes. Such large specimens have not been caught yet and in July 2017 divers were employed to explore part of the lake. Since 1998, an annual catfish hunt festivity Somovijada, has been held. The heaviest fish caught in the lake measured .

See also 

List of lakes in Bosnia and Herzegovina
List of lakes in Serbia

References 

Lakes of Bosnia and Herzegovina
Lakes of Serbia
History of Zvornik